Bryden Mountain is a mountain located in the Catskill Mountains of New York east of Delhi. Craig Hill is located south of Bryden Mountain.

References

Mountains of Delaware County, New York
Mountains of New York (state)